McKinney is a city in and the county seat of Collin County, Texas, United States. It is Collin County's third-largest city, after Plano and Frisco.

The U.S. Census Bureau listed McKinney as the nation's fastest-growing city from 2000 to 2003 and again in 2006, among cities with more than 50,000 people. In 2007, it was ranked second-fastest growing among cities with more than 100,000 people and in 2008 as third-fastest. In the 2010 census, the city's population was 131,117, making it Texas's 19th-most populous city. The population estimate produced by the city as of 2019 was 199,177, which made it Texas's 16th-most populous city. In 2020, its population was 195,308. As of May 2017, McKinney was the third-fastest growing city in the United States.

The Census Bureau defines an urban area of northern Dallas-area suburbs that are separated from the Dallas–Fort Worth urban area, with McKinney and Frisco as the principal cities; the McKinney–Frisco urban area had a population of 504,803 as of the 2020 census, ranked 83rd in the United States.

History
On March 24, 1849, William Davis, who owned  where McKinney now stands, donated  for the townsite. Ten years later, McKinney incorporated, and in 1913, the town adopted the commission form of government.

For its first 125 years, McKinney served as the county's principal commercial center. The county seat provided farmers with flour, corn, cotton mills, cotton gins, a cotton compress, and a cottonseed oil mill, as well as banks, churches, schools, newspapers, and from the 1880s, an opera house. Businesses also came to include a textile mill, an ice company, a large dairy, and a garment-manufacturing company. The population grew from 35 in 1848 to 4,714 in 1912. By 1953, McKinney had a population of more than 10,000 and 355 businesses. The town continued to serve as an agribusiness center for the county until the late 1960s.

By 1970, Plano surpassed McKinney in size. McKinney experienced moderate population growth, from 15,193 in the 1970 census to 21,283 in the 1990 census. By the mid-1980s, the town had become a commuter center for residents who worked in Plano and Dallas. In 1985, it had a population of just over 16,000 and supported 254 businesses. Since then, McKinney's rate of increase has been much more dramatic. In the 2000 census, McKinney had grown to 54,369 with 2,005 businesses and in the 2010 census the population had more than doubled to 131,117 residents. The Census Bureau's most recent estimated population for McKinney (July 1, 2015) is 162,898. The most recent population estimate, produced by the city as of January 1, 2019, is 187,802.

Both the city and the county were named for Collin McKinney, signer of the Texas Declaration of Independence, and a congressman for the Red River district of the Republic of Texas. He was the author of a bill establishing counties in the northern part of the state.

Geography

Climate
McKinney is considered part of the humid subtropical region.
On average, the warmest month is July.
On average, the coolest month is January.
The maximum average precipitation occurs in May.
It is also part of the Texas blackland prairies, which means it gets hot summers because it is in the Sun Belt. Humidity makes temperatures feel higher, and winters are mild and are usually rainy; snowstorms occasionally occur. Spring is the wettest part of the year, which brings winds from the Gulf Coast.

Demographics

At the 2010 U.S. census, the city had a population of 131,117 people. In 2020, the U.S. Census Bureau tabulated a population of 195,308, representing continued growth from the city's 2000 population of 54,369.

As of the 2000 U.S. census, 64% of the foreign-born residents of McKinney originated from Mexico. Since 2009, 70% of McKinney's total population born outside of the United States had arrived in the U.S. in the 1990s. In May 2017, the U.S. Census Bureau reported that McKinney was the third fastest-growing city in the United States. It had a 5.9% growth rate between 2015 and 2016.

Of the 68,458 households at the 2019 American Community Survey, 59.8% were married-couples living together. The average household size was 2.88 and the average family size was 3.36. In 2010, there were 28,186 households; 45.1% had children under the age of 18 living with them, 63.6% were married couples living together, 9.5% had a female householder with no husband present, and 23.2% were not families; 19.0% of all households were made up of individuals, and 5.3% had someone living alone who was 65 years of age or older. The average household size was 2.89 and the average family size was 3.29.

In 2010, the median income for a household in the city was $63,366, and for a family was $72,133. Males had a median income of $50,663 versus $32,074 for females. The per capita income for the city was $28,185. About 4.9% of families and 8.5% of the population were below the poverty line, including 9.2% of those under age 18 and 7.9% of those age 65 or over. In 2019, the median income in the city increased to $89,828; the mean income was $111,588.

Economy

According to the city's 2018 Comprehensive Annual Financial Report, the top 10 employers in the city are:

Government

Local government
According to the Comprehensive Annual Financial Report (2016), the city's various funds had $324.6 million in total revenues, $247.9 million in total expenditures, $1.36 billion in total assets, $437.6 million in total liabilities, and $363.9 million in cash and investments.

The McKinney City Council has seven members. Two members and the mayor are elected at large, and four members are elected to single-member districts.

McKinney's City Manager serves under the direction of the City Council, and administers and coordinates the implementation of procedures, policies, and ordinances.

The city of McKinney is a voluntary member of the North Central Texas Council of Governments association, the purpose of which is to coordinate individual and collective local governments and facilitate regional solutions, eliminate unnecessary duplication, and enable joint decisions.

State government
McKinney is represented in the Texas Senate by Republican Angela Paxton, District 8, and Republican Drew Springer, District 30. McKinney is also represented in the Texas House of Representatives by Republican Scott Sanford, District 70.

Federal government
At the federal level, Texas's U.S. senators are John Cornyn and Ted Cruz. McKinney is in the 3rd Congressional district, which is represented by Keith Self.

Police department

The McKinney Police Department is the primary municipal law enforcement agency that serves the city. Chief Greg Conley is the head of the department. In fiscal year 2016–2017, the department had 201 sworn peace officers and 59 non-sworn civilian positions.

The department was awarded national accredited status from the Commission on Accreditation for Law Enforcement Agencies (CALEA) and is also a Texas Police Chief's Association Foundation (TPCAF) Recognized Agency, making it only the third agency in Texas to receive both state and national accreditation.

Notable recent incidents in the department's history include the high-profile investigation of the McKinney homicide that claimed the lives of two adults and two high school football players; a 2010 attack on the police department headquarters by a gunman who fired over 100 rifle rounds at the building and employees after attempting to detonate a truck and trailer full of explosives; and protests and media attention after a video was released of the 2015 Texas pool party incident.

Education

Colleges
McKinney is the home of the Central Park Campus of Collin College near the city's center at US 75 and US 380, which opened in 1985 as the initial campus for the community college district. The Collin Higher Education Center campus of Collin College opened in southern McKinney in 2010 and offers select bachelor's, master's, and doctoral degree programs in partnership with Texas A&M University-Commerce, Texas Woman's University, The University of Texas at Dallas, and the University of North Texas.

Public school districts
Two-thirds of McKinney residents are in the McKinney Independent School District; the remaining third are part of Frisco Independent School District, Prosper Independent School District, Allen Independent School District, Melissa Independent School District, Lovejoy Independent School District, or Celina Independent School District.

Five of the seven school districts serving the city placed in the top 5% in the Niche 2018 Best School Districts in America rankings; Allen ISD ranked #33 nationally, Frisco ISD ranked #60, Prosper ISD ranked #73, Lovejoy ISD ranked #78, and McKinney ISD ranked #268.

Public high schools

For high school, the two thirds of the city's students who are in McKinney ISD attend McKinney High School, McKinney North High School and McKinney Boyd High School. The remaining third of McKinney students attend Emerson High School (Frisco ISD), Heritage High School (Frisco ISD), Rock Hill High School (Prosper ISD), Allen High School, Melissa High School, Lovejoy High School, or Celina High School.

In the 2018 U.S. News & World Report high school rankings, Lovejoy High School ranked #49 in Texas rankings and #283 nationally; McKinney North High School ranked #76 and #627, respectively; McKinney Boyd High School ranked #85 and #722 respectively; and Allen High School ranked #130 and #1228, respectively.

Public charter schools
Imagine International Academy of North Texas is a no-tuition open-enrollment public charter school for grades K–12 in McKinney. It is open to students in any school district that serves McKinney residents. It is state-funded, independently run, and not part of any school district.

Private schools
There are two private schools in the city that serve all grades from K–12, McKinney Christian Academy and Cornerstone Christian Academy.

Media

The McKinney Courier-Gazette is a daily newspaper published in McKinney, covering Collin County. It is owned by American Community Newspapers. It has a daily circulation of 4,400 and a Sunday circulation of 26,400.

Infrastructure

Transportation
McKinney is served by two U.S. Highways: US 75 and US 380. The city is also bordered by the Sam Rayburn Tollway, a toll road administered by the North Texas Tollway Authority that runs to Dallas/Fort Worth International Airport.

McKinney offers discounted transit services to elderly, disabled, or low-income residents through the Collin County Transit Program.

The far southwestern corner of McKinney, in the large Craig Ranch development, has a trolley bus that serves the development and some shopping centers in the surrounding area.

Major highways
 
 
 
  (Sam Rayburn Tollway)

Air
McKinney National Airport and Aero Country Airport provide private and business air services.

Railways
Dallas, Garland and Northeastern Railroad (DGNO)

Notable people

 Len Akin, professional football player
 Dillon Anderson, 2nd National Security Advisor
 Mike Bolsinger, professional baseball pitcher, Toronto Blue Jays
 Larry Brantley, actor and comedian known for voicing Wishbone on the PBS series of the same name
 William Calhoun, professional wrestler who used the professional name "Haystack" or "Haystacks" Calhoun
 Hollie Cavanagh, singer who placed fourth on 11th season of American Idol
 Tommy Crutcher, football player; honorable mention All-State football at McKinney High School in 1959; NCAA All-American at Texas Christian University in 1963; played eight seasons (1965–1972) in the NFL, mainly for the Green Bay Packers
 Clem Daniels, pro football player
 Elvis Duran, hall-of-fame radio host at Z100
 Chad Haga, professional road racing cyclist
 Kenneth E. Hagin, influential Pentecostal preacher, often called "father" (or "granddaddy") of the Word of Faith movement
 Randy Ethan Halprin, a member of the Texas Seven
 Adrianna Hicks, actress
 Ronald Jones II, professional football player; graduate of McKinney North High School
 Tom Kite, professional golfer
 Brittany Lang, professional golfer, 2016 U.S. Women's Open champion
 Zach Lee, professional baseball player
 Anthony Lynn, head coach of NFL's Los Angeles Chargers; player for Denver Broncos (1993), San Francisco 49ers (1995–1996), Denver Broncos (1997–1999)
 Ray McDonald, NFL running back
 MO3, rapper
 Karthik Nemmani, 2018 Scripps National Spelling Bee champion
 Lee Nguyen, professional soccer player for New England Revolution
 Ken Paxton, Texas state senator from District 8; member of Texas House of Representatives, 2003–2013; state attorney general
 Alex Puccio, professional climber and bouldering champion
 Johnny Quinn, Olympic athlete
 Jason Ralph, actor
 Robert Richardson Jr., NASCAR driver
 Scott Sanford, certified public accountant and executive pastor of Cottonwood Creek Baptist Church; Republican member of Texas House of Representatives from McKinney since 2013
 Guinn Smith, gold medalist at 1948 Summer Olympics in pole vault
 James W. Throckmorton, governor of Texas, U.S. congressman, and member of Texas Senate
 Andy Timmons, professional guitarist
 London Woodberry, professional soccer player
 Dudley Wysong, professional golfer

See also

Mickey Mantle World Series

Notes

References

External links

 City of McKinney official website
 McKinney Chamber of Commerce
 McKinney Convention & Visitors Bureau
 McKinney Community Development Corporation
 McKinney Economic Development Corporation

 
Cities in the Dallas–Fort Worth metroplex
Cities in Texas
Cities in Collin County, Texas
County seats in Texas
Populated places established in 1848